Mark Richard Tami (born 3 October 1962) is a  Welsh Labour Party politician who has been the Member of Parliament (MP) for Alyn and Deeside since 2001.

Early life
Born in Enfield, north London, Tami was educated at Enfield Grammar School (by then a comprehensive school), and graduated in history at the University of Wales, Swansea. He was previously National Head of Policy of the union Amicus (previously the Amalgamated Engineering and Electrical Union.

Parliamentary career

Tami was first elected as MP for Alyn and Deeside in 2001 with a majority of 9,222, following the decision of the seat's former MP Stephen Barry Jones to step down from Parliament.

Tami was returned again as MP for Alyn and Deeside at the 2005 general election, with a reduced majority. He resigned his post as Parliamentary Private Secretary to Dawn Primarolo on 6 September 2006, due to the refusal by Tony Blair to name a date for stepping down as Prime Minister. He was joined by future Deputy Leader of the Labour Party Tom Watson and fellow Welsh MPs Ian Lucas and Wayne David in resignation.

Tami was promoted by Gordon Brown in July 2007 to a whip. In the 2010 general election, Tami was re-elected for a third time, however with a further reduced majority of 2,919. Following the election, Labour leader Ed Miliband made Tami Pairing Whip.

Tami was re-elected as MP for Alyn and Deeside on 7 May 2015 at the general election with a slightly increased majority from 2010. In the 2017 general election, Tami was returned with a vastly increased majority of 5,235 votes and a 52.1% share of the vote.

In November 2018 he was appointed to the Privy Council.

Tami is the Chair of the All-party parliamentary group on Stem Cell Transplantation.

On Thursday 12 December 2019, Tami was the only Labour MP in North Wales not to lose his seat, narrowly beating the Conservative candidate Sanjoy Sen by just 213 votes, falling from a majority of over 5000 in the previous election.

In March 2020, Tami led a cross-party campaign to end the 9-week wait without income for people on Universal Credit when they reach state pension age. After Tami's campaign, the government changed the regulations.

Expenses
During the MPs expenses scandal Tami was one of more than 50 MPs identified by the Daily Telegraph of over-claiming on council tax expenses for their second home. Tami said, "I will go back and calculate the exact level I have over-claimed in error and repay the sum involved". He paid back the full £996.70 for council tax on his London home.

Personal life
He married Sally Daniels in July 1994 in Bromley and they have two sons. They live in Llanfynydd having lived in Bromley for many years. He is a former member of the TUC General Council and an active member of the Fabian Society.

Tami's eldest son, Max, was diagnosed with acute lymphoblastic leukaemia in 2007 at age 9. Max made a full recovery following intensive chemotherapy and a stem cell transplant at Alder Hey Children's Hospital. Tami has repeatedly called for the Government to do more to help cancer patients and their families, including providing appropriate psychological support.

Styles
 Mr Mark Richard Tami (3 October 1962 – 7 June 2001)
 Mr Mark Richard Tami MP (7 June 2001 – 23 November 2018)
 The Right Honourable Mark Richard Tami MP (23 November 2018 – Current)

References

External links

 Mark Tami MP Welsh Labour Party profile

1962 births
Living people
Welsh Labour Party MPs
UK MPs 2001–2005
UK MPs 2005–2010
UK MPs 2010–2015
UK MPs 2015–2017
UK MPs 2017–2019
British trade unionists
People from Enfield, London
Alumni of Swansea University
People educated at Enfield Grammar School
Members of the Privy Council of the United Kingdom
UK MPs 2019–present